Events of the year 1410 in Poland.

Incumbents
Monarch: Władysław II Jagiełło

Events
Polish-Lithuanian-Teutonic War:
9 July The Polish-Lithuanian army enters the territory of the Teutonic order

12 July Emperor Sigismund of Luxemburg declares war on Poland; Działdowo conquered by the allied army

13 July Dąbrówno (with its important Teutonic fortress) is conquered; the Teutonic order moves its army towards the village of Grunwald

15 July Battle of Grunwald: In one of the biggest battle of the Middle Ages the Polish-Lithuanian army defeats the Teutonic order; One of the battle's victims is the order's Grand master Ulrich von Jungingen

25 July Beginning of the unsuccessful Siege of Malbork, quasi capital of the Teutonic state, to which the entire order fled after the lost battle

7 August The town of Toruń is handed over to king Jagiełło after a three-week siege

31 August The town of Grudziądz with its important Teutonic fortress is conquered  by the Polish army

19 September Jagiełło withdraws from Malbork

September The army of Sigismund of Luxemburg invades Poland

29 September Jagiełło passes through Toruń

31 October Grudziądz reconquered by the Teutonic order; the same happens to the other fortresses won earlier by the Polish army

Deaths
Matthew of Cracov; Polish bishop and religious writer

15th century in Poland
1410 in Europe